Mazhar Munir is a television and film actor.  Before co-starring in the 2005 movie Syriana, he appeared in three British television shows: The Bill, Mile High, and Doctors.

Life and career

Munir was born in London to Azad Kashmiri immigrant parents, a carpenter and a seamstress. He began his career by attending weekly drama workshops at the Theatre Royal Stratford East. He was then contacted by Hampstead Theatre in London, who offered them a stage role in Local Boy.

After that, Munir appeared in several TV series before making his film debut in Syriana. Munir was well received in Syriana, where he played Wasim Khan, an unemployed Pakistani immigrant living in the Middle East; the New York Times praised his "delicate, watchful sensitivity".

Munir also earned his marketing degree from Middlesex Business School. He speaks several languages including Urdu, Hindi and Punjabi.

Filmography

External links
 
 Mazhar Munir on Moviefone
 Mazhar Munir on Filmbug

Year of birth missing (living people)
Living people
English male television actors
English male film actors
English people of Mirpuri descent
People from Azad Kashmir